Anse Réunion FC is a Seychelles football club based in La Digue, which currently plays in the Seychelles League.

Achievements
Seychelles League: 1
 2006

Seychelles FA Cup: 2
 2002, 2012

Seychelles League Cup: 1
 2007

Performance in CAF competitions
CAF Champions League: 1 appearance
2007 – Preliminary Round

CAF Confederation Cup: 1 appearance
2008 – First Round

CAF Cup Winners' Cup: 1 appearance
2003 – First Round

Current squad

Players with dual nationality
  Andy Ernesta
  Armantal Ernesta

Football clubs in Seychelles
Association football clubs established in 1957
1957 establishments in Seychelles